Atomi (trans. The Atoms) were a Yugoslav rock band formed in Zagreb in 1961. They were one of the pioneers of the Yugoslav rock scene.

Heavily influenced by The Shadows, Atomi were arguably the first instrumental rock band in Yugoslavia. The band gained local popularity, which gave them an opportunity to become the first rock band to make recordings for Radio Zagreb and the first Yugoslav rock band to appear on television. The group disbanded in 1964.

History

1961-1964
Atomi were formed in Zagreb at the end of 1961 by Darko Brozović (guitar), Miro Wolfhart (guitar) and Mišo Zozoli (bass guitar). After they made their first amateur recordings, they were joined by drummer Josip "Pepi" Dajčman, after which they started to perform live. Heavily influenced by The Shadows, Atomi are considered the first instrumental rock band to be formed in Croatia, and perhaps in Yugoslavia.

The band gained local popularity and started performing regularly in the Zagreb club Neboder (Skyscraper). Their performances got them the attention of the media, so they were invited to make recordings for Radio Zagreb, becoming the first rock band to make recordings for that radio station. For Radio Zagreb they recorded the songs "Sedam dana oko vatre" ("Seven Days around the Fire"), "Johnny Will" (a cover of Pat Boone song) and "Zlatna ulica" ("Golden Street", a cover of The Shadows song "Find Me a Golden Street"). These recordings increased their popularity in Croatia. In October 1962, in the Istra concert hall, the band made recordings for the Television Zagreb children's show Slavica i Mendo, becoming the first Yugoslav rock band to appear on television.

In 1963 the band released their only record, a 7" single with the songs "Driftin' (U zanosu)", a cover of The Shadows song "Driftin'", and "Golden Earrings 
(Zlante naušnice)", a cover of Les Fantômes song "Golden Earrings". Later that year the band released the EP Juri Gagarin (Yuri Gagarin) with the vocal quartet Problem. The EP featured the songs "Juri Gagarin" (a cover of Luciano Beretta song "Yuri Gagarin"), "Havajski tvist (Hawaiian Twist)", a cover of The Chakachas song "Hawaiian War Twist"), "Twist na ulici" ("Twist in the Street") and "Čarobni trenuci (Sweet Moments)".

Atomi disbanded in 1964, when the members of the band went to serve their mandatory stints in the Yugoslav People's Army.

Post breakup
In 2005 Atomi songs "Driftin' (U zanosu)", "Johnny Will", "Sedam dana oko vatre", "Zlatna ulica", "Golden Earrings (Zlatne naušnice)", "Plava zvijezda (Blue Star)" and "Besame Mucho" were released on the box set Kad je rock bio mlad - Priče sa istočne strane (1956-1970) (When Rock Was Young - East Side Stories (1956-1970)), released by Croatia Records in 2005 and featuring songs by the pioneering Yugoslav rock acts.

Discography

EPs
Juri Gagarin (with Problem; 1963)

Singles
"Driftin' (U zanosu)" / "Golden Earrings (Zlatne naušnice)" (1963)

References

External links 
 Atomi at Discogs

Croatian rock music groups
Yugoslav rock music groups
Instrumental rock musical groups
Musical groups established in 1961
Musical groups disestablished in 1964